Jean de Marguenat (2 May 1893 – 16 April 1956) was a French screenwriter and film director. He directed nineteen films including the 1937 British musical The Street Singer (1937).

Selected filmography
 Miche (1932)
 The Red Robe (1933)
 Prince Jean (1934)
 The Street Singer (1937)
 Happy Days (1941)
 Behold Beatrice (1944)

References

Bibliography
 De Lafayette, Maximillien.  Hollywood Femmes Fatales and Ladies of Film Noir, Volume 1.

External links

1893 births
1956 deaths
Film directors from Paris